Sir John (Jack) Alfred Roy Egerton (11 March 1918 – 21 December 1998) was an Australian trade union organiser and member of the Australian Labor Party.

Born in Emerald, Queensland, Egerton was educated at Rockhampton and Mount Morgan High Schools. He started his working life as a boilermaker (his father had also been a boilermaker). Very soon he turned to political activity, with marked success.

When only 25 years old Egerton became state secretary of the Queensland Boilermakers Union, and well before reaching the age of 40 he had become one of the leading figures in Queensland politics, as Vince Gair (ALP Premier since 1952) found to his cost in 1957. In addition to being president of the Queensland Trades and Labor Council from 1967 to 1976, Egerton served as president of the Australian Labor Party state executive for much of the same period (1968–76). Meanwhile, he held high rank in the Australian Council of Trade Unions and was a member of the ALP's federal executive.

During the 1970s, Egerton acted as Prime Minister Gough Whitlam's right-hand man in Queensland and frequently clashed with the state's conservative Premier Sir Joh Bjelke-Petersen. Subsequently he fell out with Whitlam, the results of this quarrel being dramatic and unexpected on all sides.

In 1976 Egerton became one of the few Australian Labor Party members to accept a knighthood, in violation of the party's general principle to reject titular honours. His recent predecessors included William McKell (1951), Edward McTiernan (1951), Robert Cosgrove (1959), and Dorothy Tangney (1968). Exactly why Egerton broke with ALP tradition and accepted the honour was a question that he never publicly answered. It is said that the only man who knew the secret was former Senator Albert Patrick Field, but Field committed suicide in 1990 without revealing anything about the subject.

Malcolm Fraser, who had defeated Whitlam in a landslide at the December 1975 federal election, offered the knighthood to Egerton for service to the trade union movement. The award cost Egerton his ALP membership, and earned him the name of 'Jumping Jack the Black Knight', as well as prompting in some quarters the even  more hostile epithet 'Labor Rat'. By odd coincidence, Egerton, the son of a boilermaker, received his knighthood from Governor-General Sir John Kerr, also the son of a boilermaker. An outraged Whitlam would later say the knighthood was "the most inappropriate conferral of the title since Queen Elizabeth I knighted Sir Toby Belch".   Egerton's wife, Lady (Moya) Egerton had her ALP membership restored in 1977, but Sir Jack was never reinstated to the party.

Egerton was later elected as an alderman of the Gold Coast City Council 1979-85, and served as the Deputy Mayor of the Gold Coast for a time.

References

Sources
Sir Jack Egerton

1918 births
1998 deaths
Australian Knights Bachelor
Australian trade unionists
Australian boilermakers
People from Central Queensland